Kendra Terpenning is a Canadian costume designer in film and television, who won the  Canadian Screen Award for Best Costume Design at the 10th Canadian Screen Awards in 2022 for her work on the film Night Raiders.

She was a CAFTCAD Award nominee in 2021 for her work on the film Goalie.

References

External links

Canadian costume designers
Canadian women artists
Living people
Year of birth missing (living people)
Canadian women in film
Best Costume Design Genie and Canadian Screen Award winners